The following elections occurred in the year 1982.

Africa
 1982 Burundian legislative election
 1982 Comorian legislative election
 1982 Djiboutian parliamentary election
 1982 Gambian general election
 1982 Guinean presidential election
 1982 Malagasy presidential election
 1982 Malian parliamentary election
 1982 Mauritian general election
 1982 Sierra Leonean parliamentary election
 1981–82 Sudanese parliamentary election
 1982 Zairean parliamentary election

Asia
 1982 Indonesian legislative election
 1982 Malaysian general election
 1982 North Korean parliamentary election
 1982 Philippine barangay election
 1982 Sri Lankan presidential election
 1982 Sri Lankan national referendum

India
 1982 Indian presidential election

Australia
 1982 Flinders by-election
 1982 Florey state by-election
 1982 Lowe by-election
 1982 Mitcham state by-election
 1982 Nedlands state by-election
 1982 South Australian state election
 1982 Tasmanian state election

Europe
 1982 Albanian parliamentary election
 1982 Dutch general election
 1982 Finnish presidential election
 February 1982 Irish general election
 November 1982 Irish general election
 1982 Portuguese local election
 1982 Stockholm municipal election
 1982 Swedish general election

France
 1982 French cantonal elections

Spain
 1982 Spanish general election

North America
 1982 Guatemalan general election
 1982 Salvadoran Constitutional Assembly election
 1982 Salvadoran legislative election
 1982 Salvadoran presidential election

Canada
 1982 Alberta general election
 1982 Brantford municipal election
 1982 New Brunswick general election
 1982 Newfoundland general election
 1982 Northwest Territories division plebiscite
 1982 Ontario municipal elections
 1982 Ottawa municipal election
 1982 Prince Edward Island general election
 1982 Saskatchewan general election
 1982 Toronto municipal election
 1982 Yukon general election

United States
 1982 United States Senate elections
 1982 United States elections
 Early 1980s recession
 1982 United States gubernatorial elections

United States gubernatorial
 1982 Alabama gubernatorial election
 1982 Arkansas gubernatorial election
 1982 California gubernatorial election
 1982 Maine gubernatorial election
 1982 Massachusetts gubernatorial election
 1982 Michigan gubernatorial election
 1982 Minnesota gubernatorial election
 1982 New York gubernatorial election
 1982 Oregon gubernatorial election
 1982 South Carolina gubernatorial election
 1982 Texas gubernatorial election
 1982 United States gubernatorial elections

United States mayoral
 1982 New Orleans mayoral election

Alabama
 1982 Alabama gubernatorial election

Arkansas
 1982 Arkansas gubernatorial election

California
 1982 California gubernatorial election
 United States House of Representatives elections in California, 1982

Louisiana
 1982 New Orleans mayoral election

Maine
 1982 Maine gubernatorial election

Massachusetts
 1982 Massachusetts general election
 1982 Massachusetts gubernatorial election
 United States Senate election in Massachusetts, 1982

Michigan
 1982 Michigan gubernatorial election

Minnesota
 1982 Minnesota gubernatorial election
 United States Senate election in Minnesota, 1982

Nebraska
 United States Senate election in Nebraska, 1982

New Mexico
 United States Senate election in New Mexico, 1982

New York
 1982 New York gubernatorial election

North Dakota
 United States Senate election in North Dakota, 1982

Oregon
 1982 Oregon gubernatorial election

South Carolina
 1982 South Carolina gubernatorial election
 United States House of Representatives elections in South Carolina, 1982

United States House of Representatives
 1982 United States House of Representatives elections
 United States House of Representatives elections in California, 1982
 United States House of Representatives elections in South Carolina, 1982

United States Senate
 1982 United States Senate elections
 United States Senate election in Massachusetts, 1982
 United States Senate election in Minnesota, 1982
 United States Senate election in Nebraska, 1982
 United States Senate election in New Mexico, 1982
 United States Senate election in North Dakota, 1982
 United States Senate election in West Virginia, 1982

West Virginia
 United States Senate election in West Virginia, 1982

Oceania
 1982 Fijian general election
 1982 Papua New Guinean general election

Australia
 1982 Flinders by-election
 1982 Florey state by-election
 1982 Lowe by-election
 1982 Mitcham state by-election
 1982 Nedlands state by-election
 1982 South Australian state election
 1982 Tasmanian state election

See also

 
1982
Elections